Qmunity (officially Qmunity, BC's Queer, Trans, and Two-Spirit Resource Centre Society), formerly known as the Centre, is an LGBT community centre located on Bute Street in the Davie Village neighbourhood of the West End of Vancouver, British Columbia, Canada.

Activities and initiatives 
Qmunity houses or operates a number of programs and initiatives, including the Vancouver Pride House during the 2010 Winter Olympic Games; the Transgender Health Program, a program operated in cooperation with the Vancouver Coastal Health regional health authority and which moved to Qmunity after Vancouver General Hospital's Gender Clinic closed in 2002.

Pride House Vancouver 
The Vancouver location of Pride House was housed within Qmunity. During the 2010 Winter Olympics, the Vancouver and Whistler Pride Houses served as venues for LGBT sportspeople, coaches, visitors and their friends, families and supporters, and became the first Pride Houses at an Olympics. Although both Pride Houses offered information and support services to LGBT athletes and attendees, the Whistler location in Pan Pacific Village Centre had a "celebratory theme", while the Vancouver venue emphasised education about Vancouver's LGBT community and, for non-Canadian athletes, information about immigration to and asylum in Canada, including "legal resources" from Egale Canada and the International Lesbian, Gay, Bisexual, Trans and Intersex Association (IGLA).

Notable visitors to Pride House Vancouver include openly gay Canadian Olympic swimmers Mark Tewksbury and Marion Lay, as well as Vancouver mayor Gregor Robertson and American political satirist Stephen Colbert.

See also
 List of LGBT community centres

References

External links
 

LGBT community centres
LGBT culture in Vancouver
Organizations based in Vancouver